Kosovo competed at the 2015 European Games, in Baku, Azerbaijan from 12 to 28 June 2015.

Medalists

Sports

As Kosovo's independence was disputed by Serbia it was only eligible to participate in Aquatics (Diving, Swimming, Synchronised swimming and Water polo), Cycling (BMX, Mountain biking and Road), Gymnastics (Acrobatic, Aerobic, Artistic, Rhythmic and Trampoline), Karate and Wrestling.

Archery

Kosovo entered one male and one female archer, thereby entitling it also to compete in the mixed team event.

Boxing

Shooting

Women

References

Nations at the 2015 European Games
2015 in Kosovan sport
2015